Tikaré (also Tinkari and Tinari) is a town in Bam Province, Burkina Faso. It is the capital of the Tikare Department and had a population of 5,344.

References

Populated places in the Centre-Nord Region